Lapposyrphus lapponicus (Zetterstedt, 1838), the common loopwing aphideater (in North America) or Lapland syrphid fly (in Europe), is a common species of syrphid fly observed across the Northern Hemisphere. The adults are commonly found on flowers from which they get both energy-giving nectar and protein rich pollen. Larvae feed on aphids.

References

Hoverflies of North America
Diptera of Europe
Syrphini
Insects described in 1838
Taxa named by Johan Wilhelm Zetterstedt